Carlina Fortes Pereira (c. 1926 – 11 December 2011) was a Cape Verdean activist, politician, and prominent figure within the country's independence movement during the Portuguese colonial era. Following independence, she became country's inaugural First Lady of Cape Verde during the presidency of her husband, Aristides Pereira.

Pereira married Aristides Pereira, the future President of Cape Verde. During the 1960s, she moved from Portuguese Cape Verde to Conakry, Guinea, where her husband, a fellow member of the pro-independence African Party for the Independence of Guinea and Cape Verde (PAIGC), was already living in exile.

Carlina Pereira became the first First Lady of Cape Verde in 1975 upon independence from Portugal. She was also elected honorary president of the Organization of Cape Verdean Women (OMCV) during the same period. Pereira held the position of First Lady from 1975 until 1991 when President Pereira left office. She was succeeded in the role by Cape Verde's second first lady, Tuna Mascarenhas.

Both Carlina and Aristides Pereira suffered from declining health during their later years. Carlina Pereira became sick with a long-term illness beginning in 2009. In 2010, she was flown to Portugal for medical treatment. She returned to Cape Verde in June 2011, as she reportedly wished to spend her remaining life at her home in the Prainha neighborhood of Praia.

Former President Aristides Pereira died in Portugal on 22 September 2011, following complications of diabetes and surgery to repair a broken femur. Carila Pereira, who had been in declining health, died just three months later on 11 December 2011 in Praia, Cape Verde, at the age of 85. She was survived by her two daughters, Estela Maria Pereira and Manuela Pereira.

References

2011 deaths
First ladies of Cape Verde
Cape Verdean women in politics
African Party for the Independence of Cape Verde politicians
People from Praia
Year of birth uncertain